Robert Gilchrist Smith (February 1, 1931 – April 1, 2013) was an American professional baseball player, a left-handed pitcher who played for the Boston Red Sox,  St. Louis Cardinals, Pittsburgh Pirates and Detroit Tigers of Major League Baseball in all or part of four seasons spanning  through .

Smith's professional career lasted for 15 years (1948–51; 1954–64), interrupted by military service during the Korean War. Signed originally by the Red Sox, he made Boston's early-season roster in 1955, and appeared in one game in relief on April 29 against the Chicago White Sox. Summoned in the sixth inning with one out and two men on base and Chicago already in the lead, 5–0, Smith surrendered a base on balls to Nellie Fox and a two-run single to Minnie Miñoso before retiring the side; he then pitched a scoreless seventh inning. It would be his only appearance in a Red Sox uniform.

He worked in six games as a relief pitcher for the Cardinals during the early weeks of  before being sold to the Pirates at the May cutdown. He remained with Pittsburgh for the rest of that season. Thrust into a starting role late in the year, he threw a complete game, eight-hit victory over the Philadelphia Phillies on September 8. He then played another full year, for the Pirates. He began the year in the starting rotation, but was winless in his first three appearances. Sent to the bullpen, he was given only one other start for the rest of the year. He then worked 20 more games in relief for the 1959 Pirates before he was released on waivers to the Tigers in mid-June. Detroit used him in only nine games in relief, where he was ineffective, and sent him to Triple-A Charleston for part of the season, his last in the majors.

Smith played another five years at the Triple-A level before his retirement at age 33.  As a big leaguer, he worked in 91 games pitched, 83 in relief, and won four of 13 decisions (.308), with two saves. In 166 innings pitched, he allowed 174 hits and 83 bases on balls. He struck out 93 and registered two complete games. All of his victories, saves and complete games came as a Pirate.

His career coincided with another left-handed pitcher named Bob Smith, nicknamed "Riverboat", who also came through the Red Sox' system. The two Bob Smiths were intermittent teammates in the Boston organization during 1951, 1955 and 1956.

References

External links
, or Retrosheet
 Venezuelan Professional Baseball League statistics
 Legacy.com – Robert. G. Smith obituary

1931 births
2013 deaths
American military personnel of the Korean War
Baseball players from New Hampshire
Boston Red Sox players
Charleston Senators players
Columbus Jets players
Denver Bears players
Detroit Tigers players
Hawaii Islanders players
Hornell Maple Leafs players
Louisville Colonels (minor league) players
Major League Baseball pitchers
Oneonta Red Sox players
Patriotas de Venezuela players
People from Aiken County, South Carolina
People from Haverhill, New Hampshire
People from Santa Rosa County, Florida
People from Texarkana, Arkansas
People from Woodsville, New Hampshire
Pittsburgh Pirates players
Roanoke Ro-Sox players
Rochester Red Wings players
St. Louis Cardinals players
San Francisco Seals (baseball) players
Santa Marta (baseball club) players
Scranton Red Sox players
Seattle Rainiers players
Shreveport Sports players
Wellsville Nitros players